Panasapadu is a village adjacent to Samalkota-Kakinada Bypass Road situated in East Godavari district near Kakinada town, in Andhra Pradesh State.

References

Villages in East Godavari district